GEI may refer to:

 Gebe language
 Gei (Lala Hsu album)
 Gei Zantzinger (1936–2007), American filmmaker
 Global Entrepreneurship Index
 Global Environmental Institute
 Green Enterprise Initiative, in Hong Kong
 Gross enrolment ratio